Johan Banér (23 June 1596 – 10 May 1641) was a Swedish field marshal in the Thirty Years' War.

Early life
Johan Banér was born at Djursholm Castle in Uppland. As a four-year-old he was forced to witness how his father, the Privy Councillour Gustaf Banér, and uncle, Sten Axelsson Banér (also a Privy Councillour), were executed at the Linköping Bloodbath in 1600. They were accused of high treason by King Charles IX because of their support of King Sigismund. Though it was the father of King Gustavus Adolphus who had Banér's father executed, the two men developed a strong friendship from an early age, mostly because Gustavus Adolphus reinstated the Banér family soon after his coronation.

Military career
Banér joined the Swedish Army in 1615 when he participated in the Swedish siege of Pskov during the Ingrian War, he proved himself to be an exceptionally brave young man.

He served with distinction in the wars with Russia and Poland, and had reached the rank of colonel by the age of 25.

In 1630, Gustavus Adolphus landed in Germany and as one of the king's chief subordinates, Banér served in the campaign of north Germany, and at the first Battle of Breitenfeld he led the right wing of Swedish cavalry. He was present at the taking of Augsburg and also Munich, and rendered conspicuous service at the Lech and at Donauwörth.

At the unsuccessful assault on Albrecht von Wallenstein's camp at the Alte Veste, Banér received a wound, and soon afterwards, when Gustavus marched towards Lützen, was left in command in the west, where he was opposed to the imperial general Johann von Aldringen. Two years later, as Swedish field marshal, Banér, with 16,000 men, entered Bohemia and, combining with the Saxon army, marched on Prague. But the complete defeat of Bernard of Saxe-Weimar in the first Battle of Nördlingen stopped his victorious advance.

After this event the Peace of Prague placed the Swedish army in a very precarious position, but the victories won by the united forces of  Banér and Alexander Leslie at Wittstock (4 October 1636), restored the paramount influence of Sweden in central Germany. Banér in his report to Queen Christina on the battle of Wittstock: "[My soldiers] would have fallen into total disorder if Field-Marshal Leslie with the five brigades of foot which he had with him during the battle had not assisted us just in time and manfully attacked and turned 4 brigades of the enemy’s infantry away from us so that we could finally gain our breath".

However, the three combined armies were considerably inferior in force to those they defeated, and in 1637 Banér was unable to make headway against the enemy. Rescuing with great difficulty the beleaguered garrison of Torgau, he retreated beyond the Oder into Pomerania.

In 1639, however, he again overran northern Germany, defeated the Saxons at Chemnitz and invaded Bohemia itself. The winter of 1640–1641 Banér spent in the west. His last achievement was an audacious coup de main on the Danube. Breaking camp in mid-winter (a very rare event in the 17th century) he united with the French under the Comte de Guébriant and surprised Regensburg, where the Diet was sitting. Only the break-up of the ice prevented the capture of the place. Banér thereupon had to retreat to Halberstadt. Here, on 10 May 1641, he died, possibly due advanced liver cirrhosis caused by his excessive alcohol consumption, after designating Lennart Torstenson as his successor. He was much beloved by his men, who bore his body with them on the field of Wolfenbüttel. On the other hand, the enemies of Sweden rejoiced and even a parody requiem hoping that he was burning in hell was composed in Bohemia that was badly pillaged by Banér. He was buried at the Riddarholmen Church in Stockholm.

Assessment
Banér as a general achieved his best results during the reign of Queen Kristina under Axel Oxenstierna's command. If Wittstock had been a battle he erroneously claimed from Leslie after the fact (witnessed by his differing reports of 1636 and 1640), Chemnitz was probably his finest hour. He reputedly declined tempting offers that were made to him by the emperor to induce him to enter his service.

Family
In 1623, Banér married Catharina Elisabeth von Pfuel (1598–1636), Lady in waiting of Maria Eleonora of Sweden and daughter of Adam von Pfuel zu Johansfelde und Vichel and his wife, Barbara von Burgsdorff. She died on 20. February 1636. On 25. July 1636 Banér married Countess Elisabeth Juliana von Erbach (1600–1640), widow of Count Count Georg Ludwig von Löwenstein-Scharfeneck (1587-1633) and daughter of George III, Count of Erbach-Breuberg and his wife, Countess Maria von Barby-Mühlingen (1563-1619). After the death of his second wife, he married for the third time to Margravine Johanna von Baden-Durlach (1623-1661). He had children only with his first wife. His son from his first marriage, Gustaf Adam (1624-1681) received the dignity of Count Banér af Sortavala.

References

General and cited references 
 

 Attribution

External links

1596 births
1641 deaths
17th-century Swedish politicians
Field marshals of Sweden
Members of the Privy Council of Sweden
Military personnel of the Thirty Years' War
People from Danderyd Municipality
Swedish nobility
Swedish people of the Thirty Years' War